Biochimie is a monthly peer-reviewed scientific journal covering the fields of biochemistry, biophysics, and molecular biology. All articles are currently in English; previously articles in French were also published. , the editor-in-chief is Bertrand Friguet, succeeding Richard H. Buckingham.

History
The journal was established in 1914 under the title Bulletin de la Société de Chimie Biologique, obtaining its current title in 1971.

Abstracting and indexing
The journal is abstracted and indexed in:

According to the Journal Citation Reports, the journal has a 2021 impact factor of 4.372.

References

External links

Société Française de Biochimie et de Biologie Moléculaire

Biochemistry journals
Elsevier academic journals
Publications established in 1914
Monthly journals
English-language journals